Beowulf is a legendary Geatish hero in the eponymous epic poem, one of the oldest surviving pieces of English literature.

Etymology and origins of the character
A number of origins have been proposed for the name Beowulf.

Beowulf
Henry Sweet, a philologist and linguist specializing in Germanic languages, proposed that the name Bēowulf literally means in Old English "bee-wolf" or "bee-hunter" and that it is a kenning for "bear". Recorded instances of similar names mirror this etymology. The AD 1031 Liber Vitae records the name Biuuuwulf. The name is attested to a monk from Durham and means bee wolf in the Old Northumbrian dialect. The 11th century English Domesday Book contains a recorded instance of the name Beulf. The scholar  suggested that the name Beowulf derived from a mistranslation of Böðvarr with -varr interpreted as vargr meaning "wolf".
However, Sophus Bugge questioned this etymology, and instead suggested that the personage Böðvarr Bjarki derived from Beowulf.

Beow-Wolf
In 2005, Andy Orchard theorized an etymology on the basis of the common Old Norse name Þórólfr (which literally translates to "Thor Wolf"), stating in parallel that a "more likely" meaning for the name would be the "wolf" of the Germanic god Beow.

Biewolf
English philologist Walter William Skeat proposed an etymological origin in a term for "Woodpecker" citing the Old Dutch term biewolf for the bird. Skeat states that the black woodpecker is common in Norway and Sweden and further reasons that the "indominatable nature" and that the "bird fights to the death" might have influenced the choice of the name. This etymological origin has been criticized as not being in accordance to Grimm's law and Skeat may have recanted the proposal at a later date.

Beado-Wulf (war wolf)
The editors of Bosworth's monumental dictionary of Anglo-Saxon propose that Beowulf is a variant of beado-wulf meaning "war wolf" and that it is cognate with the Icelandic Bodulfr which also means "war wolf".

Beowulf before Beowulf
Scholars have long debated the origins of the character Beowulf. Some have argued that Beowulf existed in heroic-legendary tradition prior to the composition of Beowulf, while others have believed that the Beowulf poet invented his Geatish protagonist. Leonard Neidorf has argued that Beowulf was present in (now lost) heroic-legendary cycles before Beowulf was composed. Neidorf argued that the seventh-century usage of the name ‘Biuuulf’ (Beowulf), which involves an element (Beow) that was unproductive in contemporary name-giving, suggests that legends of Beowulf existed well before the composition of our extant poem.

Beowulf manuscript

Origins in Geatland

As told in the surviving epic poem, Beowulf was the son of Ecgtheow, a warrior of the  Swedish Wægmundings. Ecgþeow had slain Heaðolaf, a man from another clan (named the Wulfings) (according to Scandinavian sources, they were the ruling dynasty of the Geatish petty kingdom of Östergötland). Apparently, because the victim was from a prominent family, the weregild was set too high, and so Ecgþeow was banished and had to seek refuge among the Danes. The Danish king Hroðgar generously paid the weregild, and had Ecgþeow swear an oath.

Ecgþeow was in the service of the Geatish king Hreðel, whose daughter he married. They had Beowulf, who grew up with the Geats. Beowulf's childhood friend was Breca the Bronding "supposed to be the inhabitants of the island Brännö, lying off the coast of West Gothland in the Cattegat". This would be a realistic location for a childhood friend of Beowulf, and the poem describes a swimming contest between them.

Zealand and Grendel
When King Hroðgar, his wife Wealhþeow, and his court were terrorized by the monstrous Grendel, Beowulf left Geatland (West Götaland) and sailed to Zealand with fourteen warriors in order to pay his father's debt. During the night, Grendel arrived to attack the sleeping men and devoured one of the other Geats before seizing Beowulf. As no manmade weapon could harm Grendel, Beowulf fought back with his bare hands and tore off the beast's arm. Grendel fled back to the bog to die from his wound, and his arm was attached to the wall of Heorot. The next day, Beowulf was lauded and a skald (scop) sang and compared Beowulf with the hero Sigmund.

However, during the following night Grendel's mother arrived to avenge her son's death and collect weregild. As Beowulf slept in a different building he could not stop her. He resolved to descend into the bog in order to kill her. They fought beside Grendel's corpse, and Beowulf finally won with the aid of an enchanted giant sword stolen from the lair's plundered wooden box.

Return to Geatland, kingdom, and death

Having returned to Geatland, Beowulf is described as taking part in a raid (a genuine historic event) against the Franks with his king Higlac. Higlac died during the raid, and Beowulf swam home in full armour. Back in Geatland, queen Hygd offered Beowulf the throne but Beowulf declined in favour of the young prince Heardred. However, Heardred received two Swedish princes, Eadgils and Eanmund who reported that they had fled their uncle Onela who had usurped the Swedish throne. This led to a Swedish invasion in which Heardred was killed. Beowulf was proclaimed king and decided to avenge Heardred and to help Eadgils become king of Sweden.

The event when Onela was slain was probably a historic event. Even though it is only briefly mentioned in Beowulf, it occurs extensively in several Scandinavian sources where it is called the Battle on the Ice of Lake Vänern. For example, Snorri Sturluson wrote: Onela rode Raven, as they rode to the ice, but a second one, a grey one, hastened, wounded by spears, eastwards under Eadgils. [...] In this fight Onela died and a great many of his people. Then king Eadgils took from him his helmet Battle-boar and his horse Raven. (Although, in Snorri's text the names are in their corresponding Old Norse forms).

Beowulf ruled the Geats for 50 years, until his realm was terrorized by a fire-breathing dragon after a thief stole a golden cup from its hoard of treasure. After unsuccessfully attacking the dragon with his thegns, Beowulf decided to pursue the monster into its lair at Earnanæs, but only his young Swedish relative Wiglaf dared join him. Beowulf's sword broke; but he dealt the dragon its death-blow with his dagger. He had been mortally wounded by the dragon's poisonous bite. Dying, he was carried out by Wiglaf, and with his last breaths named Wiglaf his rightful heir. His body was burned on a funeral pyre, and his ashes buried in a barrow by the sea.

The last three lines of the poem are, in Seamus Heaney's translation:
:They [the Geats] said that of all the kings upon the earth,
he was the man most gracious and fair-minded,
kindest to his people and keenest to win fame.
The statement is clear, except for the final word, lof-geornest ('keenest to seek fame'), which is two-edged. It is no shame for a hero to seek fame, but it may be possible to be too eager for it.

References

 
Characters in Beowulf
Dragonslayers
English mythology
Fictional Vikings
Geats
Heroes in Norse myths and legends
Male characters in literature
Mythological kings
People whose existence is disputed
Fictional monster hunters
Fictional dragonslayers
Fictional swordfighters